The 1961 CFL season is considered to be the eighth season in modern-day Canadian football, although it is officially the fourth Canadian Football League season.

CFL News in 1961
The Western Canada Intercollegiate Rugby Union merged with the Canadian Intercollegiate Athletic Union.

The WIFU changed its name to become the Western Football Conference.

The CFL season schedule was partially interlocked to allow teams of the Eastern Football Conference to play regular season games against the teams of the Western Football Conference. Beginning this season, teams played opponents in their own conference three times and opponents in the other conference once, meaning the length of the regular season remained unchanged in both conferences (i.e. sixteen games for Western teams and fourteen games for Eastern teams). The format remained as such until 1974 when the Eastern Conference extended its schedule to sixteen games.

A third consecutive year of interleague exhibition matches were scheduled with teams in the National Football League. As in 1959 and 1960, both CFL teams lost, with the Toronto Argonauts falling to the St. Louis Cardinals, 36–7, on August 2, and the Montreal Alouettes losing to the Chicago Bears, 34–16, on August 5). The Hamilton Tiger-Cats had a better idea for success: challenge the nascent American Football League to a duel. The Tiger-Cats faced off against their cross-border "rivals", the Buffalo Bills, on August 8. The Tiger-Cats defeated the Bills, 38–21, giving the Canadian league its first win over an American team since 1941. The AFL, embarrassed over the loss, declined to play another international game, and with the CFL consistently losing to NFL teams, the CFL ended international competition.

The 49th edition of the Grey Cup went to overtime for the first time at Toronto's CNE Stadium. The Winnipeg Blue Bombers won championship over the Hamilton Tiger-Cats, 21–14.

The CFL made rule changes for the 1962 season, permitting four defensive backs per team to have unlimited blocking during rushing plays, as long as they are lined up outside the ends. Additionally the tackle-eligible play became illegal.

Regular season standings

Final regular season standings
Note: GP = Games Played, W = Wins, L = Losses, T = Ties, PF = Points For, PA = Points Against, Pts = Points

Bold text means that they have clinched the playoffs.
 Winnipeg and Hamilton have first round byes.

Grey Cup playoffs
Note: All dates in 1961

Conference Semi-Finals

Conference Finals

Playoff bracket

Grey Cup Championship

The 1961 Grey Cup remains the only CFL title game decided in overtime. It also marked the fourth time in five years that the championship was decided between the Blue Bombers and Tiger-Cats.

CFL Leaders
 CFL Passing Leaders
 CFL Rushing Leaders
 CFL Receiving Leaders

1961 Eastern All-Stars

Offence
QB – Bernie Faloney, Hamilton Tiger-Cats
RB – Dick Shatto, Toronto Argonauts
RB – Don Clark, Montreal Alouettes
RB – Ron Stewart, Ottawa Rough Riders
E  – Marv Luster, Montreal Alouettes
E  – Paul Dekker, Hamilton Tiger-Cats
F – Dave Mann, Toronto Argonauts
C  – Norm Stoneburgh, Toronto Argonauts
OG – Ellison Kelly, Hamilton Tiger-Cats
OG – Kaye Vaughan, Ottawa Rough Riders
OT – Milt Crain, Montreal Alouettes
OT – Tom Jones, Ottawa Rough Riders

Defence
DT – Bobby Jack Oliver, Montreal Alouettes
DT – John Barrow, Hamilton Tiger-Cats
DE – Billy Ray Locklin, Montreal Alouettes
DE – Pete Neumann, Toronto Argonauts
DG – Marty Martinello, Toronto Argonauts
LB – Hardiman Cureton, Hamilton Tiger-Cats
LB – Jim Andreotti, Toronto Argonauts
LB – Ron Brewer, Montreal Alouettes
LB – Gerald Nesbitt, Ottawa Rough Riders
DB – Don Sutherin, Hamilton Tiger-Cats
DB – George Brancato, Ottawa Rough Riders
S  – Jim Rountree, Toronto Argonauts

1961 Western All-Stars

Offence
QB – Jackie Parker, Edmonton Eskimos
RB – Willie Fleming, British Columbia Lions
RB – Earl Lunsford, Calgary Stampeders
RB – Leo Lewis, Winnipeg Blue Bombers
RB – Johnny Bright, Edmonton Eskimos
E  – Jack Gotta, Saskatchewan Roughriders
E  – Farrell Funston, Winnipeg Blue Bombers
C  – Neil Habig, Saskatchewan Roughriders
OG – Cornel Piper, Winnipeg Blue Bombers
OG – Mike Kmech, Edmonton Eskimos
OT – Frank Rigney, Winnipeg Blue Bombers
OT – Don Luzzi, Calgary Stampeders

Defence
DT – Mike Wright, Winnipeg Blue Bombers
DT – Bill Clarke, Saskatchewan Roughriders
DE – Tony Pajaczkowski, Calgary Stampeders
DE – Herb Gray, Winnipeg Blue Bombers
MG – Ron Atchison, Saskatchewan Roughriders
LB – Gord Rowland, Winnipeg Blue Bombers
LB – Bob Ptacek, Saskatchewan Roughriders
LB – Wayne Harris, Calgary Stampeders
LB – Dave Burkholder, Winnipeg Blue Bombers
DB – Oscar Kruger, Edmonton Eskimos
DB – Norm Rauhaus, Winnipeg Blue Bombers
S  – Harvey Wylie, Calgary Stampeders

1961 CFL Awards
 CFL's Most Outstanding Player Award – Bernie Faloney (QB), Hamilton Tiger-Cats
 CFL's Most Outstanding Canadian Award – Tony Pajaczkowski (DE), Calgary Stampeders
 CFL's Most Outstanding Lineman Award – Frank Rigney (OT), Winnipeg Blue Bombers
 CFL's Coach of the Year – Jim Trimble, Hamilton Tiger-Cats
 Jeff Russel Memorial Trophy (Eastern MVP) – Bobby Jack Oliver (DT), Montreal Alouettes
 Jeff Nicklin Memorial Trophy (Western MVP) – Jackie Parker (QB), Edmonton Eskimos
 Gruen Trophy (Eastern Rookie of the Year) – Gino Berretta (OE/P), Montreal Alouettes
 Dr. Beattie Martin Trophy (Western Rookie of the Year) – Larry Robinson (DB), Calgary Stampeders
 DeMarco–Becket Memorial Trophy (Western Outstanding Lineman) – Frank Rigney (OT), Winnipeg Blue Bombers

References

Canadian Football League seasons
CFL